Kalou, or Yawa, is a Papuan language of Papua-New Guinea. It is closely related to Amal.

References

Yellow–Wanibe languages
Languages of Sandaun Province